That's My Bitch may refer to:

 "D.M.B.", a song by ASAP Rocky
 "That's My Bitch", a song by City Girls from the 2020 album City on Lock
 "That's My Bitch", a song by Jay-Z and Kanye West from the 2011 album Watch the Throne
 "That's My Bitch", a song by Lil Mosey from the 2018 album Northsbest